Roberto Júlio de Figueiredo (born 20 February 1979) is a Brazilian former footballer.

Career 
Born in Maringá, Paraná, Roberto has played with FC Tokyo of J2 League, and has previously played with Oita Trinita and Avispa Fukuoka in Japan and Ponte Preta in Campinas, São Paulo, Brazil.

Club statistics

References

External links

1979 births
Living people
Brazilian footballers
Brazilian expatriate footballers
Expatriate footballers in Japan
Campeonato Brasileiro Série A players
J1 League players
J2 League players
Associação Atlética Ponte Preta players
Avispa Fukuoka players
Oita Trinita players
Sagan Tosu players
Yokohama FC players
FC Tokyo players
Association football midfielders